Joseph Bokina (April 4, 1910 – October 25, 1991) was a Major League Baseball pitcher who played with the Washington Senators in .

External links

1910 births
1991 deaths
Major League Baseball pitchers
Baseball players from Massachusetts
Washington Senators (1901–1960) players